The Deaton Cabin is a historic summer cabin on Suits Us Road in Bella Vista, Arkansas.

Background
It is a single-story structure, fashioned out of rustically cut wood framing.  It is a long rectangle in shape, oriented north–south and parallel to Suits Us Road.  Its gable roof extends over a former carport that has been screened and converted into a porch area.  Its entrance is sheltered by a gabled portico, and there is a rough fieldstone chimney just to its left.  It is little-altered since its c. 1924 construction, and is one of a handful of surviving summer cabins from that period in Bella Vista.

The cabin was listed on the National Register of Historic Places in 1988.

See also
National Register of Historic Places listings in Benton County, Arkansas

References

Houses on the National Register of Historic Places in Arkansas
Houses completed in 1924
Houses in Benton County, Arkansas
National Register of Historic Places in Benton County, Arkansas
Buildings and structures in Bella Vista, Arkansas
Former buildings and structures in Arkansas
1924 establishments in Arkansas